The Intruder is a 2019 American psychological thriller film directed by Deon Taylor and written by David Loughery. The film stars Michael Ealy and Meagan Good as a couple who buy a house in the country, only to realize its previous owner (Dennis Quaid) refuses to let it go. It was released in the United States on May 3, 2019, by Sony Pictures Releasing, receiving generally negative reviews from critics. However, it was a commercial success, grossing $40 million worldwide against its $8 million budget.

Plot
Scott (Michael Ealy) and Annie Howard (Meagan Good) purchase a Napa Valley house called "Foxglove" from its previous owner, Charlie Peck (Dennis Quaid). Charlie explains his wife, Ellen, passed away from cancer two years earlier and he will soon be moving to Florida to live with his daughter, Cassidy. Scott is instantly irritated by Charlie who appears overly friendly with Annie and keeps dropping by unannounced.

Scott and Annie invite their friend Mike and his wife over to spend the night. When Mike goes outside for a cigarette, he senses he is being watched. The following morning, he notices a cigarette burn on the seat of his luxury car that wasn't there previously. Charlie continues to show up without an invitation; he explains he is not moving to Florida just yet, and is staying at the Royal Hotel in town. Tensions rise between Scott and Annie due to Scott's coldness toward Charlie, and it is also revealed that, before getting married, he had cheated on her with a colleague.

When a neighbour tells Scott that Charlie's wife killed herself with one of Charlie's shotguns, Scott asks Mike to investigate him. Meanwhile, Charlie has developed an obsession with Annie and begins visiting her at home when Scott is not there. One morning, while Scott is out jogging, a truck runs into him from behind; it turns out that Charlie was the driver. Mike uncovers that Charlie had gone into debt and was facing legal trouble and therefore was forced to sell the house to Scott and Annie. While Scott is in the hospital, Charlie shows up at the house, and he and Annie have dinner. Mike goes to check on her and is confronted by Charlie, who declares he has a chance to get back all he lost and must get rid of Scott. Charlie then kills Mike with an axe.

The next morning, Scott contacts Cassidy, who has since changed her name, but she hangs up when Scott mentions her father. Scott also discovers Charlie has never stayed at the Royal. Charlie appears in the house and passionately declares his feelings for Annie. She claims she is feeling ill and calmly asks Charlie to leave, which he does. Annie then goes upstairs and finds a hidden door behind the linen closet, leading to Charlie's underground cellar, where he has been living the whole time since selling the house. Meanwhile, Scott is driving home and receives a call back from Cassidy who explains Charlie is a pathological liar who murdered her mother after she threatened a divorce.

Back at the house, Charlie discovers that Annie has found his cellar. He knocks her unconscious, carries her upstairs and begins assaulting her. When Scott returns home, Charlie ambushes him and throws him over the hallway balcony. Charlie begins strangling Annie, but Scott reappears. The two men struggle and Annie stabs Charlie in the back. Charlie staggers away to the cellar, where he retrieves a shotgun.

Scott and Annie hide behind the bedroom door as Charlie searches the house for them. When Charlie enters the room, Scott strikes him in the head with a baseball bat and seizes the rifle. Lying on the floor bleeding, Charlie taunts Scott by saying Scott would never dare shoot him. As they stand over Charlie, Annie calls 911 and informs the dispatcher that her husband has just shot an intruder. Horrified, Charlie screams, "You don't deserve Foxglove!" Scott replies, "Go to hell," and shoots Charlie, finally killing him.

Cast
 Michael Ealy as Scott Howard
 Meagan Good as Annie Howard
 Dennis Quaid as Charlie Peck
 Joseph Sikora as Mike
 Alvina August as Rachael
 Lee Shorten as Brian
 Erica Cerra as Jillian Richards
 Kurt Evans as Grady Kramer
 Carolyn Anderson as Ellen
 Lili Sepe as Cassidy Peck Thompson/Vanessa Smith
 Raylene Herewood as Ice cream girl
 Chris Shields as doctor
 Sam Vincent as first officer
 Caroline Muthoni Muita as hotel receptionist
 Connor Mackay as man on ladder

Production
In May 2018, Ealy, Good and Quaid all signed onto the project. It was then announced that the worldwide distribution rights had been acquired by Screen Gems at the 2018 Cannes Film Festival, after production had been completed under the title Motivated Seller.

Release
The Intruder was released in the United States on May 3, 2019. It was previously set for an April 26, 2019 release, but was pushed back a week to separate from Avengers: Endgame. The film was released on Blu-Ray and DVD on July 30, 2019.

Reception

Box office
The Intruder grossed $35.4 million in the United States and Canada, and $5.2 million in other territories, for a worldwide total of $40.6 million, against a production budget of $8 million.

In the United States and Canada, The Intruder was released alongside Long Shot and UglyDolls, and was projected to gross $9–16 million from 2,222 theaters in its opening weekend. The film made $3.9 million on its first day, including $865,000 from Thursday night previews. It went on to debut to $11 million, finishing second, behind holdover Avengers: Endgame. The film grossed $6.6 million in its second weekend, finishing in fourth.

Critical response
The website's critical consensus reads, "The Intruder might appeal to fans of shout-at-the-screen cinema, but this thriller's ludicrous plot robs it of suspense – and undermines Dennis Quaid's suitably over-the-top performance." On Metacritic, the film has a weighted average score of 39 out of 100, based on 25 critics, indicating "generally unfavorable reviews." Audiences polled by CinemaScore gave the film an average grade of "B−" on an A+ to F scale, while those at PostTrak gave it 2.5 out of 5 stars and a 44% "definite recommend."

See also
List of black films of the 2010s

References

External links
 
 

2019 films
2019 psychological thriller films
African-American horror films
American psychological thriller films
Films directed by Deon Taylor
Films scored by Geoff Zanelli
Films set in the San Francisco Bay Area
Films shot in British Columbia
Films with screenplays by David Loughery
Home invasions in film
Screen Gems films
2010s English-language films
2010s American films